Lorène Dorcas Bazolo (born 4 May 1983) is a Congolese-Portuguese track and field athlete from Brazzaville. She is the national record holder in the 100 metres, with a time of 11.72 seconds. She was the congolese flag bearer at the 2012 Summer Olympics.

She competed at the African Championships in Athletics in 2008, 2010 and 2012 and represented Congo in both the 100 m at the 200 metres at the 2011 All-Africa Games. She has also represented her nation at the Summer Universiade (2009 and 2011) and the 2009 Jeux de la Francophonie.

During 2013 she arrived in Portugal on political asylum and soon joined athletics clubs JOMA, and later, Sporting Club de Portugal. After acquiring Portuguese citizenship during 2016 she has beaten the national 100 m record, which is now set at 11.21 seconds.

During the 2020 Summer Olympics, Lorène reached the 200 m semifinals with 23.20 seconds. On August 14, 2021, at the Résisprint La Chaux-de-Fonds Meeting, Switzerland, Bazolo beat her 100 m and the 25 year old 200 m national records which now stand at 11.10 and 22.64 seconds, respectively.

References

External links

1983 births
Living people
Sportspeople from Brazzaville
Republic of the Congo female sprinters
Olympic athletes of the Republic of the Congo
Portuguese female sprinters
Athletes (track and field) at the 2012 Summer Olympics
Athletes (track and field) at the 2016 Summer Olympics
Olympic athletes of Portugal
Republic of the Congo emigrants to Portugal
Naturalised citizens of Portugal
European Games competitors for Portugal
Athletes (track and field) at the 2019 European Games
Athletes (track and field) at the 2011 All-Africa Games
African Games competitors for the Republic of the Congo
Athletes (track and field) at the 2020 Summer Olympics
Olympic female sprinters
Athletes (track and field) at the 2022 Mediterranean Games
Mediterranean Games silver medalists for Portugal
Mediterranean Games bronze medalists for Portugal
Mediterranean Games medalists in athletics
World Athletics Championships athletes for Portugal